The Cathedral Church of St Mary of the Assumption, usually known as St Mary's Cathedral, is a cathedral of the Roman Catholic Church in the city of Aberdeen, Scotland. It is the home of the see of the Bishop of Aberdeen, who is the ordinary of the Diocese of Aberdeen in the Province of St Andrews & Edinburgh. It stands at 20 Huntly Street in Aberdeen.

Construction
The cathedral was designed by Alexander Ellis and opened in 1860. The spire and bells were added by Robert Gordon Wilson in 1876–77 to mark the church being raised to cathedral status.

The organ dates from 1887 and is by James Conacher of Huddersfield. The cathedral was rededicated in 1960 following simplification of the interior in alignment with the reforms of the Second Vatican Council.

Stained glass

A window of 1978 is dedicated to St John Ogilvie by David Gulland.

Monuments

The church contains monuments to four Scottish bishops: George Hay; James Kyle; John MacDonald; and Colin Grant. The latter two are also buried in the cathedral, as is Monsignor William Stopani.

Services

Over and above the daily services there is a weekly Polish mass and monthly Spanish mass.

See also
List of cathedrals in the United Kingdom
Roman Catholicism in Scotland
St Machar's Cathedral — the original cathedral of Aberdeen, now a Church of Scotland High Kirk
St Andrew's Cathedral — cathedral of the Scottish Episcopal Church

References

External links

Cathedral website

Saint Mary
Roman Catholic cathedrals in Scotland
Saint Mary
Listed cathedrals in Scotland
Roman Catholic churches completed in 1860
19th-century Roman Catholic church buildings in the United Kingdom